Scott Edward Brown (born August 30, 1956) is a retired Major League Baseball pitcher. He played during one season at the major league level for the Cincinnati Reds. He was drafted by the Reds in the 4th round of the 1975 amateur draft. Brown played his first professional season with their Rookie league Billings Mustangs in 1975, and his last season with the Kansas City Royals' Triple-A affiliate, the Omaha Royals, in 1983.

External links

Dayton Daily News article by Hall of Famer Hal McCoy (February 13, 2013)

1956 births
Living people
People from DeQuincy, Louisiana
Cincinnati Reds players
Nashville Sounds players
Eugene Emeralds players
Indianapolis Indians players
Tampa Tarpons (1957–1987) players
Billings Mustangs players
Omaha Royals players
Major League Baseball pitchers
Baseball players from Louisiana